Scotinotylus provincialis is a species of sheet weaver spider found in France. It was described by Jacques Denis in 1949.

References

Linyphiidae
Spiders described in 1949
Spiders of Europe